The 2012 Alberta general election was held on April 23, 2012, to elect members of the 28th Legislative Assembly of Alberta. A Senate nominee election was called for the same day.

During the 2011 Progressive Conservative Association leadership election, eventual winner Alison Redford stated that if she became Premier she intended to pass legislation setting a fixed election date. After taking office, her government introduced a bill relating to the timing of elections, which was passed on December 6, 2011. Unlike other fixed election date legislation in Canada, the 2011 Election Amendment Act fixes the election to a three-month period, between March 1 and May 31 in the fourth calendar year. However, like other legislation, this does not affect the powers of the Lieutenant Governor to dissolve the Legislature before this period. The writs of elections were dropped March 26, 2012.

Although the Wildrose Party led opinion polls for much of the campaign, on election night the Progressive Conservatives defied expectations to win 61 seats – a net loss of only five – en route to their 12th consecutive majority government. The victory made Redford the third woman elected in her own right as a provincial premier in Canada (after Catherine Callbeck in Prince Edward Island in 1993, and Kathy Dunderdale in Newfoundland and Labrador in 2011), and the first woman elected premier in a province outside Atlantic Canada. On September 4, 2014, the Alberta PC Party became the longest-running provincial government in Canadian history.

Background

27th Legislature

The 27th Alberta Legislature saw a significant decline in the polls for the governing Progressive Conservatives (PCs) and the popularity of Premier Ed Stelmach.

The Wildrose Party was the primary beneficiary of voter migration in opinion polls from the governing PCs, after former leader Paul Hinman won a by-election, and the party elected Danielle Smith as leader. On January 4, 2010, the Wildrose caucus supplanted the New Democrats to become the third-largest in the legislature when PC MLAs Rob Anderson (Airdrie-Chestermere) and Heather Forsyth (Calgary-Fish Creek) joined Wildrose. Later in 2010, former PC cabinet minister Guy Boutilier (Fort McMurray-Wood Buffalo) joined, becoming the party's fourth MLA. However, their support has waned in the year following, as did polling fortunes for the Liberal Party, while the Alberta NDP was polling at double its result in the previous election.

The Liberals lost two MLAs during the 27th Legislature — Dave Taylor (Calgary Currie) who left to sit as an independent, before becoming the first MLA for the Alberta Party; and Bridget Pastoor (Lethbridge-East) who crossed the floor to join the PC caucus in November 2011. However, the Liberals gained one MLA in selecting Raj Sherman (Edmonton-Meadowlark) as their leader in September 2011, who had been ejected from the PC caucus in November 2010.

On January 25, 2011, Ed Stelmach abruptly announced that he would not seek re-election, and would resign as leader of the Progressive Conservatives and as premier after a successor was chosen. Alison Redford was chosen as Stelmach's successor on October 1, 2011, and following her election the PCs improved their results in opinion polls. Her new government presented six pieces of legislation, the most notable of which regarded fixed election dates, an investigation into health care, and tougher penalties for impaired driving. All six bills were passed in the fall 2011 sitting of the 27th Legislature. The 2012 election is a result of the fixed election legislation, which fixed the date of the next provincial election in Alberta between March 1 and May 31, 2012, and requires subsequent elections in that period in the fourth calendar year thereafter. The law does not affect the ability of Alberta's Lieutenant-Governor to dissolve the assembly and call an election before that time. However, that is not likely to occur during majority governments. The legislature was dissolved and the writs were dropped on March 26, 2012.

Green Party dispute

A year after the previous general election the Alberta Greens became mired in an internal dispute that resulted in the collapse of the party, and its de-registration by Elections Alberta. Some of the former Green party executive, including former deputy leader Edwin Erickson, eventually joined the Alberta Party, while others regrouped and founded the Evergreen Party of Alberta.

Results

As indicated on the maps, the rural vote split largely on regional lines.  Wildrose support was concentrated largely in Southern Alberta while the party won only one seat north of the 53rd parallel, while the PCs were reduced to just one seat in rural Southern Alberta.  Wildrose won only three urban seats (two in Calgary and one in Medicine Hat) while the PCs won the majority of seats in both Calgary and Edmonton, swept Edmonton's suburbs and swept the two seats contested in each of Fort McMurray, Grande Prairie, Lethbridge and Red Deer.  The Liberals were confined to the two largest cities, winning three seats in Calgary and two in Edmonton.  The New Democrats won all four of their seats in Edmonton.

The PCs polled about 44 percent of the popular vote, and four cabinet ministers were defeated. The Wildrose won 17 seats to become the Official Opposition for the first time. It was a net increase of thirteen seats for the party, although two of the four Wildrose incumbents (Guy Boutilier and Paul Hinman) were defeated by their PC challengers. The party polled more than 34 percent of the popular vote, more than five times their share in the previous election, and finished a close second in dozens of constituencies.

The Liberals saw their share of the vote plummet by almost two thirds and polled under ten percent for the first time since 1982. The result therefore appeared to give credence to speculation that Liberal voters from last election voted "strategically" for moderate PC candidates to defeat the more conservative Wildrose Party. Nevertheless, the five Liberal incumbents seeking re-election all managed to do so, with the Liberals losing the three seats where their incumbents did not run again. It was the Liberals' lowest seat total since the 1986 election. The Liberals were relegated to third party status in the Legislature for the first time since 1993.

The New Democrats won four seats, double their previous total and enough to secure official party status in the Legislature.  Both NDP incumbents were re-elected. The NDP polled just under ten percent of the vote, marginally less than the Liberals' share and a modest increase from the last election.

Summary

!rowspan="2" colspan="2" style="text-align:left;" |Party
!rowspan="2" style="text-align:left;" |Party leader
!rowspan="2" style="text-align:center;" |Number ofcandidates
!colspan="4" style="text-align:center;" |Seats
!colspan="3" style="text-align:center;" |Popular vote
|-
| style="text-align:center;" |2008
| style="text-align:center;" |Dissol.
| style="text-align:center;" |2012
| style="text-align:center;" |% Change
| style="text-align:center;" |#1
| style="text-align:center;" |%
| style="text-align:center;" |Change (pp)

| style="text-align:left;" | Alison Redford
|87 ||72 ||66 ||61 ||–7.85 ||567,060 ||43.95 ||–8.77

| style="text-align:left;" | Danielle Smith
|87  ||— ||4 ||17 ||+325 ||442,429 ||34.29 ||+27.51

| style="text-align:left;" | Raj Sherman
|87 ||9 ||8 ||5 ||–37.5 ||127,645 ||9.89 ||–16.54

| style="text-align:left;" | Brian Mason
|87 ||2 ||2 ||4 ||+100 ||126,752 ||9.82 ||+1.34

| style="text-align:left;" |Glenn Taylor
|38 ||— ||1 ||— ||–100 ||17,172 ||1.33 ||+1.32

| style="text-align:left;" |Larry Ashmore
|25 ||—2 ||— ||— ||— ||5,082 ||0.394 ||–4.162

| style="text-align:left;" colspan=2 |Independent
|12 ||— ||1 ||— ||–100 ||3,511 ||0.272 ||–0.53

| style="text-align:left;" |Len Skowronski
|3 ||— ||— ||— ||— ||294 ||0.0228 ||–0.19

| style="text-align:left;" |Naomi Rankin
|2 ||— ||— ||— ||— ||210 ||0.0163 ||+0.01

| style="text-align:left;" |Bart Hampton3
|13 ||— ||— ||— ||— ||68 ||0.00527 ||0.00

| style="text-align:left;" colspan="4" |Vacant
|1
|colspan=5|
|-
| style="text-align:left;" colspan="3" |Total
!429 !!83 !!83 !!87 !!+4.82 !!1,290,223 !!100.00% !!
|}
Notes:
 Results at the count.
 Results change is compared to the Alberta Greens in 2008.
 Elections Alberta lists Bart Hampton as leader of the Separation Party of Alberta, however the party's only candidate is party president Glen Dundas.

The voter turnout was 54%.

Vote and seats summaries

By region

Gains, holds, and losses

Defeated incumbents

Notes:
Morton was an incumbent in Foothills-Rocky View
Benito sat as a Progressive Conservative in the 27th Legislative Assembly, lost the candidate nomination, and ran as an independent
Boutilier was elected as a Progressive Conservative in the 2008 election
Danyluk was an incumbent in Lac La Biche-St. Paul
Lund was an incumbent in Rocky Mountain House

Opinion polls

The following is a summary of opinion polls leading up to the 2012 election.

MLAs not running again

Progressive Conservative
Cindy Ady, Calgary-Shaw
Ken Allred, St. Albert
Lindsay Blackett, Calgary-North West
Doug Elniski, Edmonton-Calder
Iris Evans, Sherwood Park
George Groeneveld, Highwood
Broyce Jacobs, Cardston-Taber-Warner
Arthur Johnston, Calgary-Hays
Ron Liepert, Calgary-West
Fred Lindsay, Stony Plain
Mel Knight, Grande Prairie-Smoky
Ken Kowalski, Barrhead-Morinville-Westlock
Richard Marz, Olds-Didsbury-Three Hills
Barry McFarland, Little Bow
Ray Prins, Lacombe-Ponoka
Rob Renner, Medicine Hat
Ed Stelmach, Fort Saskatchewan-Vegreville
Janis Tarchuk, Banff-Cochrane

Liberal
Harry Chase, Calgary-Varsity
Hugh MacDonald, Edmonton-Gold Bar
Kevin Taft, Edmonton-Riverview

Alberta Party
Dave Taylor, Calgary-Currie

Independent
Lloyd Snelgrove, Vermilion-Lloydminster

Timeline
December 12, 2008: Calgary-Mountain View MLA David Swann wins the Leadership of the Alberta Liberals replacing Kevin Taft.
May 15, 2009: Calgary-Glenmore MLA Ron Stevens resigns to accept a judgeship.
July 16, 2009: The Alberta Greens is deregistered by Elections Alberta.
July 18, 2009: Fort McMurray-Wood Buffalo MLA Guy Boutilier is removed from the Progressive Conservative caucus.
August 29, 2009: Robert Leddy is chosen as the interim leader of the Alberta Party replacing Bruce Stubbs.
September 14, 2009: A by-election in Calgary-Glenmore elects Wildrose Alliance interim leader Paul Hinman.
October 17, 2009: The Wildrose Alliance selects Danielle Smith to replace Paul Hinman as leader in a convention in Edmonton.
November 7, 2009: A leadership review of Premier Ed Stelmach is held at a PC convention in Edmonton. He garners 77.4% support.
January 4, 2010: MLAs Rob Anderson and Heather Forsyth defect from the PC to the Wildrose Alliance.
January 28, 2010: Edwin Erickson is acclaimed as leader of the Alberta Party replacing Robert Leddy.
February 24, 2010: Alberta Boundaries Commission releases its interim report on new provincial boundaries.
April 12, 2010: Calgary-Currie MLA Dave Taylor leaves the Liberal caucus to sit as an independent.
June 25, 2010: PC, turned Independent, MLA Guy Boutilier joins the Wildrose Alliance.
November 22, 2010: Edmonton-Meadowlark MLA Raj Sherman is removed from the Progressive Conservative caucus.
November 24, 2010: Sue Huff becomes interim Alberta Party leader after Edwin Erickson resigns.
December 1, 2010: The Legislative Assembly passes a bill outlining 87 electoral districts, up from the current 83. The last re-distribution was in 2004.
January 24, 2011: Calgary-Currie MLA Dave Taylor sits as Alberta Party's first MLA.
January 25, 2011: Premier Ed Stelmach announces his intention not to run for re-election, and announces he will resign his post as Premier when a successor has been chosen at a leadership convention.
February 1, 2011: David Swann, Leader of the Alberta Liberal Party, announces his intention to step down as leader after the spring 2011 legislative session, though still acting as an MLA from Calgary-Mountain View.
May 28, 2011: Glenn Taylor is elected leader of the Alberta Party.
June 26, 2011: The Wildrose Alliance Party votes to change its name to Wildrose Party.
September 10, 2011: Raj Sherman is elected leader of the Liberal Party.
September 12, 2011: Independent MLA Raj Sherman joins the Liberal caucus.
October 1, 2011: Alison Redford is elected leader of the PC Association.
October 7, 2011: Redford is sworn in as premier.
November 21, 2011: Liberal Bridget Pastoor crosses the floor to join the PC caucus.
December 6, 2011: Third and final reading of Bill 21, legislating a general election between March 1 and May 31, 2012.
December 22, 2011: The Evergreen Party of Alberta is registered with Elections Alberta, Larry Ashmore is the leader.
January 27, 2012: Vermilion-Lloydminster MLA Lloyd Snelgrove leaves the PCs to sit as an independent.
March 2012: Olds-Didsbury-Three Hills MLA Richard Marz resigns.
March 26, 2012: 27th Alberta Legislative Assembly is dissolved, and the writs are dropped.
April 9, 2012: Nominations close at 2:00 pm MT (UTC−6), with 429 people running in 87 ridings.
April 12, 2012: A leader's debate is hosted by the Alberta media and news outlets at 6:30 pm MT. It was broadcast on multiple television and radio stations, Redford, Sherman, Smith, and Mason were in attendance.
April 19, 2012: Advance polls open 9:00 am to 8:00 pm MT.
April 20, 2012: Advance polls open 9:00 am to 8:00 pm MT.
April 21, 2012: Advance polls open 9:00 am to 8:00 pm MT.
April 23, 2012: Election Day
Polls open 9:00 am to 8:00 pm MT.
Media outlets declare a PC majority at 9:00 pm.
May 3, 2012: Official announcement of the results.

Nominated candidates

Bold indicates cabinet members, and party leaders are italicized.

Northern Alberta

Central Edmonton

Suburban Edmonton

Western and Central Alberta

East Central Alberta

Central Calgary

Suburban Calgary

Southern Alberta

See also
2012 Alberta Senate nominee election
Alberta Liberal Party candidates, 2012 Alberta provincial election
Alberta New Democratic Party candidates, 2012 Alberta provincial election
Alberta Party candidates, 2012 Alberta provincial election
Evergreen Party of Alberta candidates, 2012 Alberta provincial election
Progressive Conservative Association of Alberta candidates, 2012 Alberta provincial election
Wildrose Party candidates, 2012 Alberta provincial election

Works cited

References

Bibliography

External links

Elections Alberta

 
April 2012 events in Canada